Higl is a surname. Notable people with the surname include:

Alfons Higl (born 1964), German footballer and manager
Nađa Higl (born 1987), Serbian swimmer